Vicki Copeland (born 24 November 1988) is a New Zealand female badminton player. She was the women's doubles runner-up at the Waikato International tournament partnered with Anona Pak. In 2017, she and Pak won bronze at the Oceania Championships in the women's doubles event.

Achievements

Oceania Badminton Championships 
Women's Doubles

BWF International Challenge/Series
Women's Doubles

 BWF International Challenge tournament
 BWF International Series tournament
 BWF Future Series tournament

References

External links

See also
 Sport in New Zealand

Living people
1988 births
New Zealand female badminton players